Brodovoye is a rural locality (a selo) and the administrative center of Brodovskoye Rural Settlement, Anninsky District, Voronezh Oblast, Russia. The population was 1,228 as of 2018. There are 15 streets.

Geography 
Brodovoye is located on the left bank of the Bityug River, 6 km east of Anna (the district's administrative centre) by road. Anna is the nearest rural locality.

References 

Rural localities in Anninsky District